Waldir Cardoso Lebrêgo, best known as Quarentinha (born in Belém, Pará State, 15 September 1933 – died in Rio de Janeiro, 11 February 1996) was a Brazilian football (soccer) player who played as a forward and was notable for his fearsome left foot.

Club career
Quarentinha played for Paysandu and Vitória, before joining Botafogo. After a short spell with Bonsucesso he returned to Botafogo and later played in Colombia.

He won one Bahia State League (1953), three Rio de Janeiro State League (1957, 1961, 1962), two Rio - São Paulo Cup (1962, 1964), one Mexico Tournament (1962) and one Paris Tournament (1963). He was also the top goalscorer for three consecutive years in Rio Leagues (1958, 1959, 1960).

International career
Quarentinha won 11 international caps for the Brazil national football team between 1960 and 1963, scoring 11 goals. Quarentinha also played six friendly games for Brazil in which he scored six additional goals. His greatest regret was to be left out of the Brazilian squad that defended the World Championship crown in Chile in 1962. On 12 May 1963 he was in the squad at San Siro Stadium, in a match against Italy, Pelé's only game played in Italy. He never played in FIFA World Cup and died at 62.

References

1933 births
1996 deaths
Brazilian footballers
Sportspeople from Belém
Brazil international footballers
Association football forwards
Botafogo de Futebol e Regatas players
América de Cali footballers
Unión Magdalena footballers
Deportivo Cali footballers
Atlético Junior footballers